Georgios Kalpakidis, also known as George Kalpakidis, Gorgi or GK (Greek: Γιώργος Καλπακίδης; born on 27 April 1978 in Tübingen, Germany), is a Greek songwriter, former journalist, radio & TV host, best known for having composed the 2019 Eurovision Song Contest entry for Moldova, "Stay" by Anna Odobescu. He started his radio work at the age of 13 and continued his career in the media field until 2015. He made his television debut as a host on Europe One channel, with a show called "Join Me" and also started appearing as a guest host in several projects over the next few years, on other local stations. His breakthrough came in middle 2006, when a new contract brought him to one of the biggest national networks, Macedonia TV. It was during the Eurovision 2006 period in Athens, where he was given the task to cover the event and report daily on live TV. His "ESC '2006" special, entitled "Hard Rock Hallelujah", was noted as one of the shows with the highest ratings of the year.

Kalpakidis has been covering the Eurovision Song Contest as a journalist for radio and TV stations, magazines and newspapers from 2000 until 2008. He's also starred in two horror films in 2009 and 2010, directed by Nick Samaras. His musical steps began in 2003 when he decided to enter an online remix contest. He was the winner of the competition, having scored the maximum points, awarded by the voters who chose his rendition of the original "Adrenaline" by singer Maria Louiza Vasilopoulou (aka MLV). Even though it was announced that the prize would be a collaboration with the artist on her next album, MLV was dropped by her label therefore Kalpakidis didn’t receive his reward. The next year would mark the beginning of a still ongoing course, in the Eurovision Song Contest. Kalpakidis counts several entries in national selections, all over Europe.

Entries in the Eurovision Song Contest

Entries in Eurovision Song Contest Pre-Selections

Participations in other festivals and contests

Further discography

Remixes

Filmography

References 

1978 births
Living people